Brigittea is a genus of araneomorph spiders in the family Dictynidae, first described by Pekka T. Lehtinen in 1967.

Species
 it contains six species:
Brigittea civica (Lucas, 1850) — Europe, North Africa, Turkey, Iran. Introduced to North America
Brigittea guanchae (Schmidt, 1968) — Canary Is.
Brigittea innocens (O. Pickard-Cambridge, 1872) — Italy, Eastern Mediterranean, Kazakhstan
Brigittea latens (Fabricius, 1775) — Europe to Central Asia
Brigittea varians (Spassky, 1952) — Russia (Europe), Kazakhstan, Tajikistan
Brigittea vicina (Simon, 1873) — Mediterranean to Central Asia

References

Araneomorphae genera
Cosmopolitan spiders
Dictynidae
Taxa named by Pekka T. Lehtinen